Tasanapol Inthraphuvasak (born 14 November 2005), also known as Tern Inthraphuvasak, is a Thai racing driver currently competing in the 2023 Formula Regional Middle East Championship, driving for Pinnacle VAR. He is the son of GT racing driver Vutthikorn Inthraphuvasak.

He made his car racing debut in the 2021 Formula 4 UAE Championship, and has competed in various other Formula 4 championships such as French F4, British F4 and Spanish F4, racking up wins in the latter two.

Career

Karting 
Inthraphuvasak began karting in 2013, and competed in karting championships across Asia and his native Thailand until 2017, when he began karting in the United States and Europe as well. He was vice champion of the 2017 Asian Kart Open Championship and the 2018 IAME Asia Series. He competed in the OK Junior class of the 2019 FIA Karting European Championship with KR Motorsport.

Formula 4

2021 
Inthraphuvasak made his car racing debut in January 2021, competing in the 2021 Formula 4 UAE Championship with Xcel Motorsport. He finished 5th in the standings, with three podiums and a best finish of second place.

On 12th March 2021, it was announced that Inthraphuvasak would drive for Carlin in the 2021 F4 British Championship. He was disqualified from race 3 at the opening round at Thruxton Circuit after failing to comply to a black and orange flag. Throughout the rest of the season, he finished on the podium three times, including a win during the reverse-grid race at the final round at Brands Hatch. He finished 10th in the overall standings, with 123 points.

He also appeared as a guest driver at the third round of the 2021 French F4 Championship at the Hungaroring. He took two podium finishes over the weekend.

2022 
Inthaphuvasak returned for the 2022 Formula 4 UAE Championship with MP Motorsport, for his second campaign in the series. He took pole position for race 1 in the first round at Yas Marina Circuit, and inherited the race 3 win after post-race penalties were given. He finished 7th in the overall standings.

This year, he switched to the F4 Spanish Championship, also with MP Motorsport. He took pole position for race 3 at round 1 at Algarve International Circuit, and converted it into a race win, his only of the season.

Formula Regional

2022 
In late 2022, in preparation for a full Formula Regional campaign the following year, Inthraphuvasak paired up with Graff to take part in two rounds of the Ultimate Cup Series' single-seater category. The Thai starred on debut, taking pole and winning lights to flag in his first race at the Hockenheimring. He went on to win five of his six races in the championship, in a field that included Formula E race winner and former Formula One test driver Nico Prost.

2023 
Inthraphuvasak was revealed as one of the drivers for Pinnacle VAR in the 2023 Formula Regional Middle East Championship.

Eurocup-3 
For his main 2023 campaign, Inthraphuvasak signed with Campos Racing to compete in the new Eurocup-3 series.

Racing record

Karting career summary

Esports career summary

Racing career summary 

* Season still in progress.
† As Inthraphuvasak was a guest driver, he was ineligible to score points.

Complete F4 UAE Championship results 
(key) (Races in bold indicate pole position) (Races in italics indicate fastest lap)

Complete F4 British Championship results 
(key) (Races in bold indicate pole position) (Races in italics indicate fastest lap)

Complete F4 Spanish Championship results 
(key) (Races in bold indicate pole position) (Races in italics indicate fastest lap)

Complete Formula Regional Middle East Championship results 
(key) (Races in bold indicate pole position) (Races in italics indicate fastest lap)

* Season still in progress.

References

External links 
 

Tasanapol Inthraphuvasak
Living people
2005 births
UAE F4 Championship drivers
British F4 Championship drivers
French F4 Championship drivers
Spanish F4 Championship drivers
Carlin racing drivers
MP Motorsport drivers
Pinnacle Motorsport drivers
Van Amersfoort Racing drivers
Graff Racing drivers
Formula Regional Middle East Championship drivers
Campos Racing drivers